Bosmoreau-les-Mines is a commune in the Creuse department in the Nouvelle-Aquitaine region in central France.

Geography

Population

Sights
 The church, dating from the eighteenth century.
 A museum of coalmining.
 Buffalo Farm.
 Velo Rail.

See also
Communes of the Creuse department

References

External links

Website of the coalmining museum 

Communes of Creuse